Schieren is a commune and town in central Luxembourg. It is part of the canton of Diekirch.

Schieren is served by a railway station.

Schieren was formed on 1 July 1850, when it was detached from the commune of Ettelbruck, along with the commune of Erpeldange.  The law forming Schieren was passed on 22 January 1850.

In 1894, Schieren established a fire station with five volunteer firefighters. It has a notable church.

Population

Footnotes

External links
 
  Commune of Schieren official website
  Unofficial website on local activities

Communes in Diekirch (canton)
Towns in Luxembourg